Robert Acs (born 1 July 1980, Budapest) is a Hungarian equestrian athlete. He competed at the 2006 World Championships in Aachen as individual and competed as first Hungarian dressage rider at the World Cup Final in Leipzig in 2011. In 2017 he was one of the team members at the European Championships in Goteborg in 2017, where Hungary has a dressage team for the first time in history at a European Dressage Championship.

See also 

 Equestrianism
 Arly Golombek

References

1980 births
Living people
Hungarian male equestrians
Hungarian dressage riders
Sportspeople from Budapest
20th-century Hungarian people
21st-century Hungarian people